Abao is an Indigenous Taiwanese singer and songwriter. Born Aljenljeng Tjaluvie in Taitung County, she is of the Paiwan people and performs in their language. Additionally, she is fluent in Taiwanese Hokkien and Mandarin. In 2003, she debuted with the group Abao & Brandy and won the Golden Melody Award for Best Vocal Ensemble. As a solo artist, she released an album entirely in the Paiwan language, Vavayan ("Woman") in 2016, and won the Golden Melody Award for Best Aboriginal Language Album the following year. On October 3, 2020, Abao won the Golden Melody Award for Best Aboriginal Language Album and the Album of the Year for Kinakaian ("Mother Tongue"), as well as the Song of the Year Award with "Thank You". She wrote an autobiography ("ari" meaning "let's go" in Paiwan) that was released in 2022.

References

Living people
21st-century Taiwanese women singers
Year of birth missing (living people)